Mount Meek Pass is a pedestrian mountain pass located in the Teton Range, Grand Teton National Park, in the U.S. state of Wyoming. To the south of the pass lies Death Canyon Shelf within Grand Teton National Park, while to the north can be found the region known as Alaska Basin, which is in Caribou-Targhee National Forest.

References

Mountain passes of Wyoming
Mountain passes of Teton County, Wyoming